Not Damaged is a 1930 American pre-Code comedy film directed by Chandler Sprague and written by Harold R. Atteridge and Frank Gay. The film stars Lois Moran, Walter Byron, Robert Ames, Inez Courtney, George Corcoran and Rhoda Cross. The film was released on May 25, 1930, by Fox Film Corporation.

Cast    
Lois Moran as Gwen Stewart
Walter Byron as Kirk Randolph
Robert Ames as Charlie Jones
Inez Courtney as Maude Graham
George Corcoran as Elmer
Rhoda Cross as Jennie
Ernest Wood as Peebles

References

External links
 

1930 films
1930s English-language films
American comedy films
1930 comedy films
Fox Film films
American black-and-white films
1930s American films